Utopia is a 2015 Afghan drama film directed by Hassan Nazer and Produced by Chris Robb. The film was selected as the Afghan entry for the Best Foreign Language Film at the 88th Academy Awards but it was not nominated. However, it was disqualified a few days prior to its Academy screening for having too much dialogue in English. The Afghan filmmakers union tried to appeal, bringing the language breakdown by minutes, but they were unsuccessful.

Cast
 Malalai Zikria as Janan
 Hannah Spearritt as Lucy
 Homayoun Ershadi as Najib
 Bhasker Patel as Spiritual Man
 Andrew Shaver as William
 Saahil Chadha as Rajnesh
 Arun Bali as Rajendra
 Alec Westwood as UK Doctor
 Chris Robb as William's friend

See also
 List of submissions to the 88th Academy Awards for Best Foreign Language Film
 List of Afghan submissions for the Academy Award for Best Foreign Language Film

References

External links
 

2015 films
2015 drama films
2010s Persian-language films
Afghan drama films